Jack Black is an American actor. The following are his roles in film, television series and video games.

Film

Television

Video games

References

American filmographies
Male actor filmographies